Cap Digital is a business cluster, started in 2006, a French public agency dedicated to the development of the Innovative Economy in the Île-de-France region, and in France.

Governance 

President : Henri Verdier, directeur général MFG-R&D
Vice-Presidents: Stéphane Distinguin, Fondateur FaberNovel, concepteur de la Cantine; Francis Jutand, Institut Télécom; Catherine Lucet, Directrice pôle éducation Editis.
Treasurer: Olivier Muron, Directeur des Relations Institutionnelles d’Orange Labs R&D (France Telecom).
Chief Executive Officer: Patrick Cocquet. 
Services: Carlos Cunha
Community: Françoise Colaïtis
Think Digital: Jean-Baptiste Soufron

External links
 Cap Digital
 Think Digital, the think tank of Cap Digital

Government agencies of France